Mago River (or Magi River) is a river of southern Ethiopia, entirely located in the Debub Omo Zone of the Southern Nations, Nationalities, and People's Region. It joins the Neri River to form the Usno River, a tributary of the Omo River.

See also 
 List of rivers of Ethiopia

Omo River (Ethiopia)
Rivers of Ethiopia